Castle Douglas St Andrew Street railway station served the town of Castle Douglas, Dumfries and Galloway, Scotland, from 1864 to 1867 on the Kirkcudbright Railway.

History 
The station was opened on 7 March 1864 by the Glasgow and South Western Railway. It was also known as Castle Douglas St Andrew and Castle Douglas St Andrew Road in the timetable. It closed on 1 December 1867.

References 

Disused railway stations in Dumfries and Galloway
Former Glasgow and South Western Railway stations
Railway stations in Great Britain opened in 1864
Railway stations in Great Britain closed in 1867
1864 establishments in Scotland
1867 disestablishments in Scotland